Perły (Polish for 'pearls') is a village in the administrative district of Gmina Węgorzewo, within Węgorzewo County, Warmian-Masurian Voivodeship, in north-eastern Poland. It is located in the region of Masuria, close to the border with the Kaliningrad Oblast of Russia.

History
The village was founded in 1558. In the late 19th century, the village had a population of 410, Polish by ethnicity, living off farming and horse and cattle breeding.

References

Villages in Węgorzewo County
1558 establishments in Poland
Populated places established in 1558